The Jardin d'Eole Wind Farm is a 127.5 megawatt (MW) wind farm, located in Saint-Ulric, near Matane, Quebec. It is owned and operated by Northland Power.

The wind farm began commercial operations in December 2009. The project uses 85 General Electric 1.5-MW wind turbines.

The Jardin d'Eole Wind Farm sells electricity to Hydro-Québec under a 20-year power purchase agreement. The project was completed 11 days ahead of schedule and well within its $268 million total budget.

Further reading

See also

List of onshore wind farms
List of wind farms in Canada
Wind power in Canada

References

Wind farms in Quebec
Buildings and structures in Bas-Saint-Laurent